The Ministry of Fisheries Department is a Ministry of the Government of Maharashtra. 
state.

The Ministry is headed by a cabinet level Minister. Sudhir Mungantiwar
is Current Minister of Fisheries Department Government of Maharashtra.

Head office

List of Cabinet Ministers

List of Ministers of State

References

Government ministries of Maharashtra
Maharashtra